Marvin Townsend (July 2, 1915 - November 26, 1999) was an American cartoonist known for his gag comics featured in various publications including Treasure Chest Fun and Fact, Cartoon Spice, and pulp magazines such as Amazing Stories, Argosy and others.

Townsend was born in Kansas City, Missouri.

Bibliography
A significant collection of his materials, including fan mail and a Certificate of Merit for cartooning, are housed in the Syracuse University Library.

Laugh Out (1970)
Ghostly Ghastly Cartoons (1971)
Laugh It Up (1974)

As Illustrator
Moontoons Jokes & Riddles (1970)
Fun for All: Jokes and Cartoons to Make You Laugh (1977)

See also
Charles Addams
John M. Crowther
Robert Crumb
Edward Gorey
Gary Larson
Lorin Morgan-Richards
Angus Oblong
Shel Silverstein
Gahan Wilson

References

1915 births
1999 deaths
American comic strip cartoonists
Artists from Kansas City, Missouri
National Lampoon people